Teviot Range is a mountain range in the Scenic Rim Region, Queensland, Australia.

Geography 
The principal peaks in the Teviot Range are:

 Mount Moon (Indigenous name: Kibbobum):
 Mount Alford (Indigenous name: Teenaryvilla):

References 

Mountain ranges of Queensland
Scenic Rim Region